Plectromerus roncavei is a species of beetle in the family Cerambycidae. It was described by Nearns and Miller in 2009.

References

Cerambycinae
Beetles described in 2009